Fate is a 2008 South Korean action noir film.

Plot 
Gang members Woo-min, Cheol-jung, Do-wan and Yeong-hwan are close friends, who, with the help of older gang member Gang-seop, decide to rob a casino so they can start their lives over. But Cheol-jung betrays the others, and Woo-min ends up in prison. After serving his time, Woo-min tries to stay out of trouble, but finds himself drawn back into the underworld.

Cast 
 Song Seung-heon ... Kim Woo-min  
 Kwon Sang-woo ... Jo Cheol-jung
 Kim In-kwon ... Jeong Do-wan
 Park Han-byul ... Jeong Eun-yeong
 Ji Sung ... Park Yeong-hwan
 Hong Soo-hyun ... Jo Hyo-sook
 Lee Seung-joon ... Hyo-sook's husband
 Wi Seung-cheol
 Min Eung-sik ... Jeong Doo-man
 Ahn Nae-sang ... Cha Gang-seop
 Jung Woo ... Choi Jeong-hak

Reception

The film was not a big success, selling only 858,215 tickets nationwide.

References

External links 
  
 
 
 

2008 films
2000s crime action films
2000s Korean-language films
South Korean crime action films
2008 drama films
2000s South Korean films